Matt Simpson, also known as "The Beer Sommelier", is an Atlanta-based expert on craft beer and brewing. Simpson appeared on several national news networks after President Obama's "Beer Summit" to provide a beer geek's perspective on the events. Simpson is also active in the local craft brewing industry through his organization of beer festivals and the "Beer 101" course he taught at Emory University. Simpson is a certified beer judge through the Beer Judge Certification Program, a national hands-on program to train beer judges.

References

Living people
People from Atlanta
American television personalities
Year of birth missing (living people)